Hapoel Sakhnin was an Israeli football club based in Sakhnin.

History
The club was founded in 1965, and played in the lower divisions of Israeli football, during which time the club was the starting point to the career of Zahi Armeli. In 1991 the club joined forces with Maccabi Sakhnin to form Bnei Sakhnin. However, the club was soon reformed as a separate entity and maintained its position in the lower divisions.

The club announced its dissolution prior to the 2015–16 season.

External links
Hapoel Sakhnin  The Israel Football Association

References

Sakhnin
Sakhnin
Association football clubs established in 1965
Association football clubs disestablished in 2015
1965 establishments in Israel
2015 disestablishments in Israel